Tomasi Camaneisenirosi is a Fijian former rugby union footballer. He played for Nabua Rugby Club in Fiji and won 14 caps playing for  making his test debut 10 August 1985 against  at Ballymore, Brisbane scoring a try. He played four tests in the 1987 Rugby World Cup. His final match came against  23 Jun 1990.

He is better known as a rugby sevens player, representing Fiji for over ten years and was part of the sides that went unbeaten 1990–1992 in the Hong Kong Sevens. Sporting a beard, he scored a memorable try in the 1990 final against New Zealand.

He is the father of former New Zealand sevens player Junior Tomasi Cama.

References

Fiji international rugby union players
Fijian rugby union players
1961 births
Living people
Male rugby sevens players
Fijian expatriate sportspeople in Malaysia
Fijian expatriates in Taiwan
Sportspeople from Suva
I-Taukei Fijian people